Elfi, Elfie and Elphie are feminine given names. Elfi is also a short form (hypocorism) of Elfriede. The name may refer to:

People:
 Elfriede Elfi von Dassanowsky (1924–2007), Austrian-born singer, pianist and film producer
 Elfie Donnelly (born 1950), British-Austrian writer, primarily of children's books
 Elfriede Elfi Eder (born 1970), Austrian former alpine skier
 Elfriede Elfi Graf (born 1964), Austrian singer
 Elfie Mayerhofer (1917–1992), Austrian film actress and singer
 Elfi Schlegel (born 1964), Canadian sportscaster and former gymnast
 Elfi Zinn (born 1953), German middle distance runner

Fictional characters:
 Elphie, a nickname of Elphaba, in the novel Wicked: The Life and Times of the Wicked Witch of the West and Wicked, the musical based on it
 Elphie, an elephant in City of Friends, a Norwegian animated children's series
 the title character of Elfie Hopkins, a 2012 British horror film

See also
 Elbphilharmonie, a concert building i Hamburg, Germany nicknamed 'Elphi'

Feminine given names
Hypocorisms